Leucippo, favola pastorale in 3 acts, is an Italian-language opera by Johann Adolf Hasse to a libretto by Giovanni Claudio Pasquini premiered at the Hubertusburg in 1747 and revived at Carnival 1751–52.

Broadcast
Schwetzingen Festival 2014, with Concerto Köln, conductor Konrad Junghänel

References

Operas
1747 operas
Operas by Johann Adolf Hasse